The Mara is a fictional monster in the long-running British science fiction television series Doctor Who. It is a being of pure hatred, anger and greed, and requires the fear of its victims to survive. It exists in the minds of its victims and can transmit itself telepathically, although it can also physically manifest as a giant snake. It is so evil that it cannot bear the sight of its own reflection. In the Dark Places of the Inside, it manifests as phantoms such as Dukkha (played by Jeff Stewart), Anatta (played by Anna Wing), and Annica (played by Roger Milner).

The Mara was created on the planet Manussa in the Scrampus system, turning the Manussan empire into the Sumaran empire. Eventually the Mara was defeated and driven out by a Manussan (the ancestor of the future Manussan Federator) and cast into the "dark places beyond". However, it survived.

In Kinda, the Fifth Doctor, Nyssa, Tegan and Adric encountered the Mara on the planet Deva Loka. When Tegan fell asleep near the wind chimes on Deva Loka, she became possessed by the Mara. It soon left her and possessed a native Kinda named Aris, who began to stir up the normally peaceful Kinda against an expedition of human colonists who were also present on Deva Loka. The Doctor was able to prevent the humans detonating a bomb which would have destroyed their dome and killed many Kinda, and managed to trap the Mara in a circle of mirrors. As the Mara could not bear to see its own reflection, it was driven out to the Dark Places of the Inside.

In Snakedance, Tegan became possessed by the Mara once again. She then navigated the TARDIS to Manussa, where a ceremony was to be held to mark the 500th anniversary of the banishment of the Mara. Using Tegan and a young Manussan named Lon, the Mara tried to obtain the "great crystal" with which it hoped to restore its corporeal existence. The Doctor was guided by Dojjen, an old mystic who showed him how to find the "still point". When the Mara tried to make its return at the ceremony, the Doctor concentrated his thought with a small replica of the great crystal, and by finding the still point was able to repel the Mara. Then by grabbing the great crystal, the Doctor broke the Mara's hold over its controlled victims, and destroyed its new snake body. This time, the Mara had apparently been permanently destroyed.

Unfortunately, it turns out that the Mara has retreated deeper into Tegan's mind. The Mara is revisited in the 2010 audio story The Cradle of the Snake, when it erupts in Tegan yet again. The Doctor, Tegan, Nyssa and Turlough search for a cure on Manussa, but hundreds of years in its past, when it was still an industrialized civilization. The Mara moves beyond Tegan and finally manages to possess both Nyssa and the Doctor, before finally being destroyed through an array of cameras and televisions.

In the Torchwood episode "Small Worlds", Jack speculates that "fairies" may be "part Mara".  However, his noting of "Mara" as the origin of the word "nightmare" and their ability to steal the breath from their victims suggests that he is referring to the Mara of Germanic/Scandinavian mythology rather than the Manussan Mara. Christopher Bailey, writer of Snakedance and Kinda, was a practising Buddhist and named Doctor Who'''s Mara after the Buddhist demon Mara.  The two names share a common Proto-Indo-European root.

The Mara was mentioned by the Tenth Doctor in the 2007 Children in Need special "Time Crash".

The Mara also appears in the final story in the 2014 anthology Tales of Trenzalore, when it possesses some of the inhabitants of the town of Christmas and forces them to dig up the remains of Jalen Fellwood so it can use them to get a new body. The Doctor manages to defeat the Mara by filling the snow machine with salt, something that Fellwood believed held magical properties. Because the Mara draws power from this belief, it ends up being destroyed.

List of appearances
TelevisionKindaSnakedanceAudio plays
 The Cradle of the SnakeAnthology
 Tales of Trenzalore''

See also
Mara (demon)

References

External links

Mara
Fictional monsters
Fictional snakes
Television characters introduced in 1982